Robin John Orlando Bridgeman, 3rd Viscount Bridgeman  (born 5 December 1930), is a British peer and politician.

Bridgeman is the son of Brigadier Geoffrey Bridgeman and Mary Meriel Gertrude Talbot, and the grandson of William Bridgeman, 1st Viscount Bridgeman. He was educated at Eton. He served in the Rifle Brigade in the years 1950 and 1951, commissioned as second lieutenant, and in the Royal Green Jackets reaching the rank of lieutenant.

In 1958, Lord Bridgeman became a Chartered Accountant. He was partner of Fenn and Crosthwaite in 1973, and of Henderson Crosthwaite from 1975 to 1986. From 1988 to 1990, he was director of Guinness Mahon, and from 1988 to 1994 director of Nestor-BNA. He has further been director of The Bridgeman Art Library since 1972.

Bridgeman is a past chairman of the Friends of Lambeth Palace Library and treasurer of the New England Company and the Florence Nightingale Aid in Sickness Trust. He is also a chairman of the Hospital of St John and St Elizabeth and trustee of Music at Winchester. Between 1992 and 2000, he was special trustee of the Hammersmith and Queen Charlotte's Hospital Authority.

Lord Bridgeman is a Knight of the Sovereign Military Order of Malta. He succeeded his uncle to the titles on 17 November 1982 and is one of the ninety elected hereditary peers in the House of Lords, where he sits for the Conservative Party. He is a spokesman on Home Affairs and a Government Whip.

Family
Lord Bridgeman has been married to Victoria Harriet Lucy Turton , daughter of Ralph Meredyth Turton, since 10 December 1966. They have four children:

Hon. William Orlando Caspar Bridgeman (1968–2001)
Hon. Luke Robinson Orlando Bridgeman (born 1971) 
Hon. Esmond Francis Ralph Orlando Bridgeman (born 1974)
Hon. Orlando Henry Geoffrey Bridgeman (born 1983)

References

External links

Viscount Bridgeman profile, Conservative Party website; Retrieved 17 July 2014.
Profile, thepeerage.com; Retrieved 17 July 2014. 

1930 births
Knights of Malta
Living people
People educated at Eton College
Rifle Brigade officers
Viscounts in the Peerage of the United Kingdom
English Roman Catholics
Robin
Conservative Party (UK) hereditary peers
Royal Green Jackets officers

Hereditary peers elected under the House of Lords Act 1999